No. 42 Squadron ( or LLv.42, from 3 May 1942 Le.Lv.42), renamed No. 42 Bomber Squadron (Finnish: Pommituslentolaivue 42 or PLe.Lv.42 on 14 February 1944) was a long-range bomber squadron of the Finnish Air Force during World War II. It was established in 1940. The squadron participated in the Winter, Continuation and Lapland wars as part of Flying Regiment 4, and was the only regiment in the squadron that exclusively operated Bristol Blenheim bomber aircraft. The squadron was abolished in 1952.

The Third Regiment, of the Flying Regiment 4, was established on January 16, 1940, but existed initially only on paper. Under the command of Captain Armas Eskola, the crews of its three flights were transferred to Juva on February 23 to wait for their British-purchased Blenheim fleet. The 12 aircraft, flown by English pilots, arrived at Juva Jukajärvi Airport on February 26. The machines were long-nosed, Mk.IVs. After a short period of training, the squadron took part in bombing missions from March 4, 1940, fighting the Russian invasion of the Vyborg Bay . By the start of the truce, the squadron had completed 62 aircraft-specific warfare flights. One aircraft had been lost, three of the crew had died and one had been taken as a prisoner of war.

After the Winter War, the squadron moved from Jukajärvi to the Luonetjärvi base, where training continued throughout the truce. On April 25, 1940, seven aircraft and their crew transferred to Pori Airport for a month-long mission to fly surveillance flights in the Baltic Sea and the Åland Islands. The squadron aircraft also performed aerial photography during the truce: on October 13 and November 11, 1940, the Soviet base at Hanko and the Russian airports in the Karelian Isthmus were photographed.

In the summer of 1941, at the beginning of the Continuation War, the squadron was transferred to Siikakangas Airport . The squadron flew its first military flight on June 28, performing reconnaissance and filming the sections Parikkala-Rautu and Vyborg-Sortavala with a single aircraft. These remained the only flights from the Siikakangas field. On July 3, the squadron was transferred back to Lake Luonetjärvi, with the task of supporting the field army, which was preparing to attack at the Karelian Isthmus. On July 4, the squadron bombarded Russian troops and tanks on the Tyry-Ihala road with nine aircraft, and railway equipment at Elisenvaara station on July 8, first with eight aircraft and later the same day with nine aircraft.

The third flight was discontinued on November 18 due to a shortage of aircraft. At the end of the year, the squadron had only four working Blenheim aircraft in good condition. Major Olavi Lumiala was appointed squadron commander on 4 August 1942.

The first bombing mission of 1943 was completed on February 19, when the squadron took part in the whole regiment's bombing of the weapons factories at Seke. The four aircraft from LeLv 42 all hit the target. The day after the Seke attack, the third flight of the squadron was re-established as the fleet improved. In addition to recriving repaired aircraft from the aircraft factory, the squadron received four Blenheim's from LeLv 44, who were transferring to Junkers Ju 88s.

On 14 February 1944, the name of the squadron was changed, by adding a prefix, describing its operations, and was henceforth known as Bomber Squadron 42 (PLeLv 42). On the same day, Major Kalle Kepsu became the new commander of the squadron.

The squadron participated in the Lapland war, as part of Flying Regiment 4, which was subordinate to the Sarko Flight Group. It conducted bombardment and reconnaissance missions against the retreating German troops, flying out from the Paltamo, Pudasjärvi and Kemi airports. On December 4, as the Air Force bengan transferring to its peace-time organization, the squadron was renamed the Bomber Squadron 41. The squadron flew only a few flights, and on January 20 it received orders to move to its peacetime base at Luonetjärvi, which was accomplished by January 26. Two Blenheims were lost in the Lapland War, both shot down by German air defense.

Following the lifting of the flight ban imposed by the Allied Control Commission in the fall of 1944, the squadron continued to operate from the Luonetjärvi base, training Blenheim crews up until August 1, 1945. The bombers were scrapped in accordance with the Paris Peace Agreement, which entered into force on 15 September 1947, and after a transitional period of one year, Messerschmitt Bf 109 aircraft were assigned to the squadron on 15 September 1948. The first 109s entered the squadron in October 1948. As the Messerschmitt fleet were at the end of their lives, the squadron was decommissioned on December 1, 1952, as part of the Air Force reorganization. A commemorative plaque attached to a boulder in front of Juva's municipal hall, was unveiled on July 5, 1992.

Organization

Winter War
1st Flight (1. Lentue)
2nd Flight (2. Lentue)
3rd Flight (3. Lentue)

The Squadron was equipped with 12 Bristol Blenheim Is.

Continuation War
1st Flight (1. Lentue)
2nd Flight (2. Lentue)
3rd Flight (3. Lentue)
? Flight of No. 44 Squadron (?./Le.Lv.44)
Photography Flight or Flight Ahtiainen (Valokuvauslentue or Lentue Ahtiainen)

The equipment consisted of 18 Bristol Blenheim Mk.Is, later equipped with Blenheim Mk.IVs.

Bibliography

External links
Lentolaivue 42

42